Mererid Hopwood (born February 1964) is a Welsh poet. She became in 2001 the first woman to win the bardic chair at the National Eisteddfod of Wales.

Teaching
Originally from Cardiff, Hopwood graduated with first-class honours in Spanish and German from the University of Wales, Aberystwyth. She was a lecturer in German at the University of Wales, Swansea, and since 2001 has also been a Creative Writing tutor in the Welsh Department. She was a Spanish teacher in Ysgol Gyfun Gymraeg Bro Myrddin Carmarthen until January 2010, and is currently a lecturer at the Trinity University of Carmarthen.

Hopwood was appointed in October 2020 as Professor of Welsh and Celtic Studies at Aberystwyth University.

Eisteddfodau
In 2003 she won the Crown at the National Eisteddfod in Meifod, and in 2008 the Eisteddfod's Prose Medal for her book O Ran. She is also an S4C presenter. In 2012 she was awarded the Glyndwr Award by MOMA, Machynlleth. She now lives in Carmarthen with her husband and three children, Hanna, Miriam and Llewelyn.

In August 2009, Hopwood was put forward for the position of Archdruid of the National Eisteddfod, following the death of Dic Jones. It was the first time a woman had been nominated. In November she decided to withdraw from the contest, leaving T. James Jones to fill the vacancy.

Works
Sarah Kirsch (1997)
Singing in Chains: Listening to Welsh Verse (2004)
Seren Lowri (2005)
Plentyn (2005)
Ar Bwys (2007)
O Ran (2008)
Nes Draw (2015)
Cantata Memoria (libretto) to music by Karl Jenkins (2016)
Wythnos yng Nghymru Fydd (libretto) to the opera by Gareth Glyn (2017)

References

External links
Mererid Hopwood at Literature Wales

1964 births
20th-century Welsh educators
21st-century Welsh educators
20th-century Welsh poets
21st-century Welsh poets
20th-century Welsh women writers
21st-century Welsh women writers
21st-century Welsh writers
20th-century women educators
21st-century women educators
Writers from Cardiff
Academics of Swansea University
Alumni of Aberystwyth University
Chaired bards
Crowned bards
Living people
Welsh-language poets
Welsh women poets
Welsh television presenters
Welsh women television presenters